Imjaeomneun narutbae (임자없는 나룻배) ("The Ownerless Ferry Boat") is a 1932 Korean film starring Na Woon-gyu. It premiered at Dan Sung Sa theater in downtown Seoul. This was director Lee Gyu-hwan's first film. This film is significant as the last pre-liberation film that was able to present an openly nationalistic message, because of increasing governmental censorship at this time.

Plot
The plot concerns Soo-sam, a farmer who goes to Seoul and works as a rickshaw man. He is jailed for stealing money to pay for his wife's hospital bills. Upon release from jail, he learns that his wife has had an affair. Disgusted, Soo-sam returns to his village with his daughter and becomes a ferry boat operator. When a bridge is constructed 10 years later, he loses his job. After the bridge engineer tries to rape his daughter, Soo-sam dies when he is hit by a train while trying to destroy the bridge. After their house burns, killing his daughter, Soo-sam's ferry boat remains as the "Ownerless Ferryboat" referred to in the title.  The original final scene had Soo-sam taking an axe to the bridge. This was cut by governmental censors because, as Lee says, "to axe the bridge was to describe the anger of the Korean people against the Japanese occupation."

References

Notes

References

See also
 Korea under Japanese rule
 List of Korean-language films

1932 films
Pre-1948 Korean films
Korean silent films
Korean black-and-white films